Jan S. Kolár (11 May 1896 – 30 October 1973) was a Czech film director, screenwriter, actor and film historian. He directed a big budget historical film St. Wenceslas.

Life
Jan Stanislav Kolár was born Jan Nepomucký Josef Kohn in a Jewish family in Prague. The whole family converted to Christianity and changed their surname to Kolár. He studied law at Charles University and graduated in 1921. His favorite directors of the silent era were D. W. Griffith and Paul Wegener. He started directing films in 1917.

The most important surviving Kolár's films are a crime drama The Poisoned Light, a fantasy horror The Arrival from the Darkness,  and a historical film St. Wenceslas. He stopped directing after 1929 and later worked as a studio executive in a nationalized film industry and then as a film historian in Czech Film Archive. He continued to act in supporting roles until his retirement in 1964.

In 2018 a DVD boxset with seven of Kolár's films was released by Czech Film Archive.

Selected filmography

Director and Screenwriter

References

External links

1896 births
1973 deaths
Film directors from Prague
People from the Kingdom of Bohemia
Czech Jews
Czechoslovak film directors
Silent film directors
Czech screenwriters
Male screenwriters
Czech male film actors
Czech male silent film actors
20th-century Czech male actors
Jewish Czech actors
Silent film screenwriters
20th-century screenwriters
Charles University alumni